54 Arietis is a star in the northern zodiac constellation of Aries. 54 Arietis is the Flamsteed designation. It is a challenge to view with the naked eye even under good viewing conditions, having an apparent visual magnitude of 6.27. The brightness of the star is diminished by 0.15 in magnitude from extinction caused by interstellar gas and dust. The star is positioned near the ecliptic and thus is subject to lunar occultations.

This is an aging red giant star with a stellar classification of M0 III that is currently evolving along the asymptotic giant branch. Having exhausted the supply of hydrogen at its core, the star has expanded to 41 times the Sun's radius. It varies slightly in brightness, with a periodicity of 6.2 days and an amplitude change of 0.0096 in magnitude. On average it is radiating 387 times the luminosity of the Sun from its enlarged photosphere at an effective temperature of 4,013 K.

References

External links
 HR 940
 Image 54 Arietis

M-type giants
Asymptotic-giant-branch stars
Variable stars

Aries (constellation)
Durchmusterung objects
Arietis, 54
019460
014586
0940